Ayhan Sökmen  (1929 – 30 December 2013) was a Turkish composer and physician.

See also
List of Turkish physicians

References

External links
Article 

20th-century Turkish physicians
1929 births
2013 deaths
Composers of Ottoman classical music
Composers of Turkish makam music